is a former member of the Japanese idol girl group NMB48. She is a member of NMB48's Team N.

Biography 

Tanigawa passed NMB48's 2nd generation auditions in May 2011. Her audition song was "Kiseki" by GReeeeN. Her debut was on June 5, 2011. Her stage debut was on August 13, 2011. In January 2012, she was selected to join Team M.

Tanigawa's first NMB48 senbatsu was for the single Nagiichi.

Tanigawa did jazz dance for 7 years. Her dream is to be a multi-talent.

On November 2, 2019, Tanigawa announced that she will graduate from the group during NMB48's performance. she graduated from the group on December 25, 2019.

Discography

NMB48 singles

AKB48 singles

Appearances

Stage Units
NMB48 Kenkyuusei Stage "Party ga Hajimaru yo"
 "Skirt, Hirari"

Team M 1st Stage "Idol no Yoake"
 "Itoshiki Natasha"

Team M 2nd Stage "RESET"
 "Kiseki wa ma ni Awanai"

Variety Shows
 NMB48 Geinin! (2012)

External links
 NMB48 Official Profile
 Official Blog
 Airi Tanigawa on Google+
 Airi Tanigawa on Twitter

References

1995 births
Living people
Japanese idols
Japanese women pop singers
People from Osaka Prefecture
Musicians from Osaka Prefecture
NMB48 members